Abhilasha Barak is an officer in the Indian Army from Haryana. She did her training from Officers Training Academy Chennai.She is known for becoming the first woman combat aviator in the Indian Army in 2022. She completed her one year of training from the Combat Army Aviation Training School at Nashik in Maharashtra.

Early life
Barak is from Haryana. She is the daughter of a retired colonel. She was commissioned into the Army Air Defence Corps in September 2018.

References 

Indian Air Force officers
Indian female military personnel
Year of birth missing (living people)
Living people